Hair straightening is a hair styling technique used since the 1890s involving the flattening and straightening of hair in order to give it a smooth, streamlined, and sleek appearance. It became very popular during the 1950s among black males and females of all races. It is accomplished  using a hair iron or hot comb, chemical relaxers, Japanese hair straightening, Brazilian hair straightening, or roller set/blowdryer styling. In addition, some shampoos, conditioners, and hair gels can help to make hair temporarily straight.

The process is often called "rebonding" in some countries from Southeast Asia (e.g. Indonesia, Singapore, Malaysia and Philippines). If done often, flat irons and chemicals can be damaging to hair. Excessive straightening often results in split ends. However, heat protectant sprays can decrease the damage.

Methods

Temporary (non-chemical treatment)

Hair irons and hot combs are designed to temporarily modify the shape/texture of hair. The straightened effect will usually be reversed by environmental factors, mainly contact with water from washing, rain, humidity, etc. This includes water in styling products such as gels applied after straightening, although careful use of such treatments can still produce usable results not much different from if the user had naturally straight hair before applying the product.

Overuse of heat tools can permanently alter the hair's structure. This is known as "heat damage". Use of protective sprays or lotions before heat styling may help to prevent heat damage. Once the damage has occurred, it can be disguised using various styling techniques, but not reversed. The only way to repair heat-damaged hair is to cut off the damaged hair and regrow it.

Five major tools can be used for hair straightening without any chemical treatment:

 Straightening comb (also known as a hot comb) with heat applied to the hair. 
 Hair irons (flat iron) applies heat directly to hair. For shorter hair, a flat iron with heating plates that are around 0.5 to 1 inch wide are used. Wider hair irons are used for longer hair.
 Blow dryer with a comb attachment or round brush to straighten hair. Too much heat can cause damage to the hair, so a low to medium heat level should be used to protect it and the scalp. Adding some rinse-free or leave-in hair conditioner could help moisturizing hair while using hair dryer to heat.
 Large hair rollers can be used on damp hair to stretch and straighten the hair as it dries. Often large rollers are used before blow drying to minimize heat damage
 Hair straightening brushes run on electricity. The bristles produce heat that is then absorbed by the hair by steadily brushing it with the brush. The hair is required to penetrate deep into the brush for maximum effect.

A popular temporary straightening method is the Dominican blowout which originated in the Dominican Republic. The technique spread to the United States where it was popularized by Dominican stylists. The Dominican blowout allows highly-textured and tightly-curled hair types to be straightened without the use of chemicals. It has become popular, particularly among African Americans, as an alternative to permanent hair straightening or as a method of straightening the hair between relaxers.

Permanent (chemical treatment)
Relaxers and the other methods permanently alter the structure of the hair, although new hair growth is not affected. The drug interferon alpha has been reported as being shown to modify hair follicles causing permanent change in a person's hair texture. Chemical hair straightening uses chemical substances to break disulfide bonds, also called an S-S bond or disulfide bridge, in the hair shaft.

There are several ways of permanently straightening hair. The main methods used today are:
 Keratin/Brazilian treatment - In this treatment a layer of keratin is added to the hair, followed by a hot flat iron. The keratin treatment is considered safe for hair since it uses the natural protein found in the hair shafts and is suitable for most hair conditions. The treatment straightens the hair, reduces frizz and adds a shine. The results last approximately 6 months and gradually returns to the original texture.
 Japanese/thermal reconditioning/yuko/rebonding - a non-coating treatment that loosens the cysteine bonds in the hair by application of a chemical for 15-20 minutes, and then a heat is applied to restructure the bonds into a straight type.
 Relaxers/chemical straightening - Chemical relaxers break hair’s disulfide bonds. Lye relaxers contain sodium hydroxide, while non-lye relaxers contain calcium hydroxide and can be used on more sensitive scalps.

Afro-textured hair 

Hair straightening using a hot comb or relaxer has a long history among women and men of African American descent, reflected in the huge commercial success of the straightening comb popularized by Madam C. J. Walker and other hairdressers in the early 1900s. The Madam Walker System of Beauty Culture focused more on hygiene and healthy scalps and hair than hair straightening. Her vegetable shampoo and Madam Walker's Wonderful Hair Grower (an ointment that contained sulfur) were designed to heal dandruff and severe scalp infections that were very common during a time when most Americans lacked indoor plumbing, electricity and central heating. Walker did not invent the hot comb, which was commercially available in Europe and America as early as the 1870s. While the practice has at times been a controversial issue in discussions of racial identity, visits to the hair salon have become embedded in black culture, fulfilling an important social role especially for women.

See also 
 Hair dryer
 Hot comb
 Brazilian hair straightening
 Conk
 Jheri curl
 List of hairstyles
 Natural hair movement

References

External links
 Facts about Formaldehyde in Hair Smoothing Products, Info by OSHA

Hairdressing